The 2016 CAF Champions League Final was the final of the 2016 CAF Champions League, the 52nd edition of Africa's premier club football tournament organized by the Confederation of African Football (CAF), and the 20th edition under the current CAF Champions League format.

The final was contested in two-legged home-and-away format between Mamelodi Sundowns of South Africa and Zamalek of Egypt. The first leg was hosted by Mamelodi Sundowns at the Lucas Masterpieces Moripe Stadium in Pretoria on 15 October 2016, while the second leg was hosted by Zamalek at the Borg El Arab Stadium in Alexandria on 23 October 2016. The winner earned the right to represent the CAF at the 2016 FIFA Club World Cup, entering at the quarterfinal stage, as well as play in the 2017 CAF Super Cup against the winner of the 2016 CAF Confederation Cup.

Mamelodi Sundowns defeated Zamalek 3–1 on aggregate to win the competition for the first time in its history.

Qualified teams
In the following table, finals until 1996 were in the African Cup of Champions Club era, since 1997 were in the CAF Champions League era.

Venues

Lucas Masterpieces Moripe Stadium

Lucas Masterpieces Moripe Stadium is a multi-purpose stadium having a capacity of 28,900 and is located in Atteridgeville, a suburb of Pretoria, South Africa. It is currently used mostly for football matches and serves as part-time home stadium of Premier Soccer League clubs Supersport United and Mamelodi Sundowns who also use the Loftus Versfeld Stadium. 

The stadium was named after former local soccer player Lucas Moripe. Until 2010 the stadium was known as Super Stadium.

The Germany national football team used it as a training venue during the 2010 FIFA World Cup.

Borg El Arab Stadium

Borg El Arab Stadium, is a stadium commissioned in 2005 in the Mediterranean Sea resort of Borg El Arab; 25 km west of Alexandria, Egypt. It is the largest stadium in Egypt and the second largest in Africa (after FNB Stadium in Johannesburg) with a capacity of 86,000 and is an all-seater. It is also the 27th largest stadium in the world, and the 9th largest association football stadium in the world. It is located on the Cairo-Alexandria desert highway 10 km from Borg El Arab Airport and 15 km from Alexandria's city center. A running track runs around the pitch, and the ground has four large floodlights. Only one stand is covered by a roof.

The stadium is 145 feddans, is surrounded by a fence which is 3 km long, an internal road network its long is 6 km, a parking lot which could fit 5000 cars and 200 bus beside an airstrip, there are 136 electronic entrances. The main cabin is covered by an umbrella which covers 35% of the stadium total area, and it is considered the biggest umbrella in the Middle East. Its length is 200 m, its dimension is 60 m and its area is 12,000 m2, which is equal to 3 feddans.

The stadium is air-conditioned and that condition includes the clothes chambers, the salons and entrances, also the stadium includes 8 elevators for broadcasters, handicapped, services and important persons. There are 2 sub-stadiums for training and each ground can hold 2000 spectators, includes 2 locker rooms and a stadium for Athletics. The stadium also includes a hotel for 200 guests which is air-conditioned and has a swimming pool, gym and a department building which contains 80 people. The stadium includes a building which contains 300 presses. This building includes cabinets for broadcasters, entrances for emergency, ambulance cars, 39 and cafeterias, 337 bathrooms which classified to 33 bathrooms for women and 8 bathrooms for the handicapped.

Road to final

Note: In all results below, the score of the finalist is given first (H: home; A: away).

Notes

Format
The final was played on a home-and-away two-legged basis. If the aggregate score was tied after the second leg, the away goals rule would be applied, and if still tied, extra time would not be played, and the penalty shoot-out would be used to determine the winner (Regulations III. 26 & 27).

Matches

First leg

Second leg

References

External links
Orange CAF Champions League 2016, CAFonline.com

2016
Final
CCL
CCL